The Ambassador Extraordinary and Plenipotentiary of the Russian Federation to the United Kingdom of Great Britain and Northern Ireland, or formally the Ambassador of the Russian Federation to the Court of St James's, is the official representative of the President and the Government of the Russian Federation to the Monarch and the Government of the United Kingdom.

The ambassador and his staff work at large in the Russian Embassy in London, while the official residence of the ambassador is 13 Kensington Palace Gardens.  There is a consulate general in Edinburgh.

The post of ambassador to the United Kingdom is currently held by Andrey Kelin, incumbent since 5 November 2019.

History of diplomatic relations

1553: Beginning of diplomatic relations.
 1706: Establishment of the permanent mission in the Kingdom of England.
 14 November 1720: Relations freezes as Great Britain (England's successor) refuse to recognize Russia as the empire.
 1730: Restoration of diplomatic relations.
 1741–1748: Allies in the Austrian War of Succession.
 1756–1763: Opponents in the Seven Years' War.
 22 November 1800: Emperor Paul imposed sanctions on Great Britain, diplomatic relations interrupted.
 24 March 1801: The new Emperor Alexander cancels the sanctions on the request of British monarch George III, relations restored.
 25 March 1802: Amiens peace treaty signed.
 1803–1805: Allies in the coalition against France.

The United Kingdom established diplomatic relations with the Soviet Union in 1924. However, King George V was still upset over the execution of the Romanov family and refused to receive the Soviet ambassador. In a breach of diplomatic protocol, he dispatched the Prince of Wales to accept the Soviet ambassador's credentials.

List of representatives (1556–present)

Representatives of the Tsardom of Russia to the Kingdom of England (1556–1707)

Representatives of the Tsardom of Russia to the Kingdom of Great Britain (1707–1720)

Representatives of the Russian Empire to the Kingdom of Great Britain (1731–1801)

Representatives of the Russian Empire to the United Kingdom of Great Britain and Ireland (1801–1917)

Representatives of the Russian Soviet Federative Socialist Republic to the United Kingdom of Great Britain and Ireland (1918–1923)

Representatives of the Union of Soviet Socialist Republics to the United Kingdom of Great Britain and Northern Ireland (1923–1991)

Representatives of the Russian Federation to the United Kingdom (1991–present)

See also
 List of ambassadors of the United Kingdom to Russia

References

 http://rusemb.org.uk/ambassadors/

 
United Kingdom
Russia